Group F of the 2019 FIBA Basketball World Cup was the group stage of the 2019 FIBA Basketball World Cup for the , ,  and . Each team played each other once, for a total of three games per team, with all games played at Nanjing Youth Olympic Sports Park Gymnasium, Nanjing. After all of the games were played, the top two teams with the best records qualified for the Second round and the bottom two teams played in the Classification Round.

Teams

Standings

Games
All times are local (UTC+8).

New Zealand vs. Brazil
This was the first competitive game between New Zealand and Brazil.

Greece vs. Montenegro
This was the first game between Greece and Montenegro in the World Cup. The Greeks won in EuroBasket 2011, which was the last competitive game between the two teams.

Montenegro vs. New Zealand
This was the first competitive game between Montenegro and New Zealand.

Brazil vs. Greece
This was the fifth game between Brazil and Greece in the World Cup. The Greeks won in 2006, which was the last competitive game between the two teams.

Brazil vs. Montenegro
This was the first competitive game between Brazil and Montenegro.

Greece vs. New Zealand
This was the first game between Greece and New Zealand in the World Cup. The Greeks won in the 2008 FIBA World Olympic Qualifying Tournament for Men, which was the last competitive game between the two teams.

References

External links

2019 FIBA Basketball World Cup
2018–19 in Greek basketball
2018–19 in Brazilian basketball